Iproheptine (Metron, Susat) is a nasal decongestant marketed in Japan.

See also
 Octodrine

References

Secondary amines
Isopropylamino compounds